Kornblit or Korenblit is the surname of:

Alexander Tairov (born Korenblit, 1885–1950), Russian/Soviet theatre director
Simon Kornblit (1933–2010), Belgian-born American studio executive and actor
Zalman Kornblit, Romanian Jewish playwright

See also
Kornbluth